Judson Silva Tavares (born 25 May 1993 in Arês), simply known as Judson, is a Brazilian professional footballer who plays as a midfielder for Major League Soccer club San Jose Earthquakes.

Career statistics

References

External links

1993 births
Living people
Sportspeople from Rio Grande do Norte
Brazilian footballers
Association football midfielders
Campeonato Brasileiro Série A players
Campeonato Brasileiro Série B players
Campeonato Brasileiro Série C players
Campeonato Brasileiro Série D players
América Futebol Clube (RN) players
Associação Cultural e Desportiva Potiguar players
Avaí FC players
San Jose Earthquakes players
Major League Soccer players
MLS Next Pro players